Peperomia blanda, the arid-land peperomia, is a species of herb in the family Piperaceae. The species has a natural pan-tropical distribution that encompasses Asia, Africa, Australasia, Polynesia and the Americas. The species typically grows as a perennial, somewhat succulent herb to 30 cm in height, though the form varies from prostrate and creeping to up to 60 cm tall depending on environment and genotype. The typical habitat is damp rock crevices and steep stream banks.

References

External links
https://books.google.com/books?id=cUNCAAAAIAAJ&pg=PA273&lpg=PA273&#v=onepage&q&f=false
http://www.biodiversityexplorer.org/plants/piperaceae/peperomia.htm
http://plantnet.rbgsyd.nsw.gov.au/cgi-bin/NSWfl.pl?page=nswfl&lvl=in&name=Peperomia~blanda~var.+floribunda

blanda